This is the United States Seventh Fleet Korean War order of battle.

 Task Force 70
 Task Group 70.6 Fleet Air Wing One
 VP-1 7 August 1950 – 13 November 1950; April 1951 – 29 August 1951
 VP-6 27 July 1951 – 15 January 1952
 VP-28 14 July 1950 – 10 August 1950; 28 March 1951 – 11 October 1951; 26 May 1952 – 1 December 1952
 VP-28 Detachment Able 11 October 1951 – 13 December 1951
 VP-42 19 July 1950 – 10 August 1950
 VP-46 1 December 1950 – 6 February 1951
 VP-47 Detachment 7 July 1950 – 1 January 1951
 VP-731 7 February 1951 – 13 August 1951
 VP-892 12 February 1952 – 18 September 1952
 Fleet Air Wing Six 4 August 1950 – End of war
 VP-1 29 March 1952 – 5 October 1952; 27 May 1953 – End of war
 VP-2 1 August 1951 – 2 December 1951
 VP-6 7 July 1950 – 12 February 1951
 VP-7 28 June 1953 – End of war
 VP-9 27 June 1952 – 3 January 1953
 VP-17 4 February 1953 – 1 August 1953
 VP-29 27 September 1952 – 5 April 1953
 VP-40 15 May 1951 – 12 December 1951
 VP-42 11 August 1950 – 9 April 1951; 22 November 1951 – 11 June 1952
 VP-46 25 September 1951 – 2 April 1952; 1 March 1953 – End of war
 VP-47 Detachment 7 July 1950 – 1 January 1951; 26 July 1951 – 4 March 1952; 22 November 1952 – 1 June 1953
 VP-50 Detachment 1 June 1953 – End of war
 VP-731 29 May 1952 – 8 December 1952
 VP-772 1 January 1951 – 3 August 1951
 VP-871 October 1951 – 7 July 1952
 VP-892 23 November 1950 – 9 June 1951
 No. 88 Squadron RAF Detachment
 No. 205 Squadron RAF Detachment
 No. 209 Squadron RAF Detachment
 Task Force 72 Formosa Patrol 12 September 1950
 Task Force 77
 Carrier Division One (USN)
 USS Essex 18 August 1951 – 7 March 1952
 US Air Group Five
 Carrier Division Three (USN)
 Carrier Division Five
 USS Essex 27 July 1952 –
 Cruiser Division One
 Cruiser Division Three
 Cruiser Division Five
 USS Essex 26 June 1951 – 25 March 1952; 16 June 1952 – 6 February 1953
 USS Boxer 24 August 1950 – 11 November 1950; 2 March 1951 – 24 October 1951; 8 February 1952 – 26 September 1952; 30 March 1953 – End of war
 USS Bon Homme Richard 10 May 1951 – 17 December 1951; 20 May 1952 – 8 January 1953
 USS Leyte 6 September 1950 – 3 February 1951
 USS Kearsarge 11 August 1952 – 17 March 1953
 USS Oriskany 15 September 1952 – 18 May 1953
 USS Antietam 8 September 1951 – 2 May 1952
 USS Princeton 9 November 1950 – 29 May 1951; 31 May 1951 – 29 August 1951; 21 March 1952 – 3 November 1952; 24 January 1953 – End of war
 USS Lake Champlain 26 April 1953 – End of war
 USS Valley Forge 25 June 1950 – 1 December 1950; 6 December 1950 – 7 April 1951; 15 October 1951 – 3 July 1952; 20 November 1952 – 25 June 1953
 USS Philippine Sea 5 July 1950 – 26 March 1951; 28 March 1951 – 9 June 1951; 31 December 1951 – 8 August 1952; 15 December 1952 – End of war
 USS Bataan 16 November 1950 – 25 June 1951; 27 January 1952 – 26 August 1952; 28 October 1952 – 26 May 1953
 Task Group 77.3 Formosa Patrol 20 July 1950 – 11 September 1950
 Task Group 77.7 Replenishment Group
 Task Force 79 Service Squadron 3 21 July 1950

Korean War orders of battle
United States Navy units and formations in the Korean War
Fleets of the United States Navy